Liman (from 1924–1999, Port-İliç, Iliich, Iliitch Port, Port-Ilyich, Port-Il’ich, and Port-Il’icha - after Vladimir Ilich Lenin) is a city and municipality in the Lankaran Rayon of Azerbaijan. It has a population of 12,100. The municipality consists of the city of Liman and the nearby villages of Şirinsu and Qumbaşı.

References 

Populated places in Lankaran District